is a 1966 Japanese drama film written and directed by Kaneto Shindo.

Cast
 Hideo Kanze as The Master
 Nobuko Otowa as The Housemaid
 Eimei Esumi as Young man in the village
 Daigo Kusano as Young man in the village
 Nobuko Miyamoto as Young girl
 Yoshinobu Ogawa as Neighbor / Son
 Kaori Shima as Neighbor / Son's Wife
 Taiji Tonoyama as Gonpachi
 Eijirō Tōno as Neighbor / Writer
 Jūkichi Uno as Doctor

References

External links
 

1966 films
Japanese drama films
1960s Japanese-language films
1966 drama films
Films directed by Kaneto Shindo
Japanese black-and-white films
1960s Japanese films